On 1 June 1642 the English Lords and Commons approved a list of proposals known as the Nineteen Propositions, sent to King Charles I of England, who was in York at the time. In these demands, the Long Parliament sought a larger share of power in the governance of the kingdom. Among the MPs' proposals was Parliamentary supervision of foreign policy and responsibility for the command of the militia, the non-professional body of the army, as well as making the King's ministers accountable to Parliament. Before the end of the month the King rejected the Propositions and in August the country descended into civil war.

Contents 

The opening paragraph of the Nineteen Propositions introduces the document as a petition which it is hoped that Charles, in his "princely wisdom," will be "pleased to grant." The nineteen numbered points may be summarised as follows:

It concluded "And these our humble desires being granted by your Majesty, we shall forthwith apply ourselves to regulate your present revenue in such sort as may be for your best advantage; and likewise to settle such an ordinary and constant increase of it, as shall be sufficient to support your royal dignity in honour and plenty, beyond the proportion of any former grants of the subjects of this kingdom to your Majesty's royal predecessors."

King's response 

The King's response was lengthy and entirely negative. He stated "For all these reasons to all these demands our answer is, Nolumus Leges Angliae mutari [We are unwilling to change the laws of England]." On 21 June 1642 the King's answer was read in Parliament, and it was ordered that it be displayed in the churches of England and Wales. At least six editions were also published.

Aftermath 

When examined in the context of longstanding tense relations between British monarchy and Parliament, The Nineteen Propositions can be seen as the turning point between attempted conciliation between the King and Parliament and war.

In August 1642 the government split into two factions: the Cavaliers (Royalists) and the Roundheads (Parliamentarians), the latter of which would emerge victorious with Oliver Cromwell as its leader. The idea of mixed government and the three Estates, popularized by Charles's Answer to the Nineteen Propositions, remained dominant until the 19th Century.

References

External links
 The Nineteen Propositions and the King's Answer to the Nineteen Propositions
 Charles I, Propositions Made by Both Houses of Parliament ... with His Majesties Answer Thereunto (1642)

1642 in England
English Civil War
17th-century documents